Love Will Follow is the fourth studio album released by jazz saxophonist George Howard in 1986 on TBA/GRP Records. The album reached No. 1 on the Billboard Traditional Jazz Albums chart and No. 22 on the Billboard Top R&B Albums chart.

Covers
Howard covered Kenny Loggins' Love Will Follow from his 1985 album Vox Humana upon the LP.

Critical reception

AllMusic gave the album a four out of five star rating.

Track listing

References 

1986 albums